Essential Records is a subsidiary of London Records and is an offshoot of Pete Tong's Essential Selection programme on Radio 1.

The later originated US label, run by London-Sire Records from 2000 to 2001, released dance music compilations from well-known DJs and artists including Paul Oakenfold, Fatboy Slim, Carl Cox, Pete Heller, John Digweed, Boy George, DJ Skribble, DJ Icey, and Peter Rauhofer.

References

See also
 List of record labels

British record labels
House music record labels